This article lists the confirmed national futsal squads for the 2001 UEFA Futsal Championship tournament held in Russia.

External links
UEFA.com

UEFA Futsal Championship squads
Squads